Yongtai may refer to:

Places in China
Yongtai County, a county in Fujian
Yongtai, Jiangxi (永泰), a town in Zhangshu, Jiangxi
Yongtai, Zhongjiang County (永太), a town in Zhongjiang County, Sichuan
Yongtai Township, Sichuan (永泰乡), a township in Yanting County, Sichuan
Yongtai Township, Shaanxi (永太乡), a township in Yongshou County, Shaanxi
Yongtai Station, a metro station in Guangzhou, Guangdong
Yongtai Fortress (永泰古城), a historical fortress and village in Jingtai Country, Gansu

Historical eras
Yongtai (永泰, 498), era name used by Emperor Ming of Southern Qi
Yongtai (永泰, 765–766), era name used by Emperor Daizong of Tang